DEL48 (read D.E.L. Forty-Eight) was an Indian idol group whose name is derived from its based city in New Delhi, India. They are the ninth international sister group of AKB48, after Indonesia's JKT48, China's SNH48 (former),  Thailand's BNK48, Philippines's MNL48, China's AKB48 Team SH,  Taiwan's AKB48 Team TP, Vietnam's SGO48 (disbanded), and Thailand's CGM48. Adopting the concept of "idols you can meet". Formed in 2019, the group went on a hiatus in October 2020 due to the COVID-19 pandemic and later disbanded in July 2022.

History

2018: Planning of MUM48 
During a livestream in December 2017, AKB48's general manager Yui Yokoyama announced the formation of MUM48, AKB48's supposed 8th sister group based in Mumbai, India. The group will be operated by Rashmi Raj Media Pvt. ltd., a company by producer Rashmi Sharma. An event was held to promote the group, with "girls power" and "women empowerment" as the theme of the group. Audition was soon held, but stopped abruptly in July 2018; the website became inaccessible and their social media platform stopped posting.

2019: Creation of DEL48 and MUB48 
On 19 June 2019, an event was held to announce the formation of DEL48 and MUB48. Both groups will be managed by AKS and YKBK48 Entertainment Pvt. ltd., a company headquartered in Gurgaon, with Yoshiya Kato serving as chairman and Rohit Bakshi as CEO of the company. The groups would be an addition to the AKB48 overseas sister group, following JKT48, BNK48, MNL48, AKB48 Team SH, AKB48 Team TP, SGO48, and CGM48. The groups took their name from the proposed base location of New Delhi and Mumbai, India. The groups are based on the concept of 'idols with whom fans can meet' and will be involved in the entertainment industry including theater performance, concert, other entertainment events, music record release, movies, media appearance, etc. Following the announcement, DEL48 launched its own YouTube channel and announced that it would be accepting applications from girls aged between 12 and 20. The first round of the first DEL48 audition took place from 19 July 2019, attracting more than 10,000 applicants. Each audition was five-minutes long, consisting of a singing, acting, and dancing test. The audition is scheduled to be closed on 31 July 2019.

Ahead of AKB48's performance on NHK's 2019 Kouhaku Uta Gassen, it was announced the performance will also include a member of DEL48. On 30 December 2019, Glory is introduced in AKB48's theater in Tokyo, becoming the first member to be revealed. The remaining 21 members were announced the next day, while Glory performed with AKB48 Group to sing Koi Suru Fortune Cookie. The group was confirmed to debut in Spring 2020 by Glory in a Japanese interview.

2020-2022: Debut plans, hiatus, and disbandment 
The plan to debut the group in early 2020 was postponed as a result of the COVID-19 pandemic. The group released its Overture in March 2020, followed by the release of its members' official Instagram and TikTok page. An official TikTok page for the group was also opened, featuring the members dancing to AKB48 and BNK48's Koi Suru Fortune Cookie and the latter's High Tension. The group later began a weekly upload on their Instagram and YouTube page with each members having their own contents.

In May 2020, DEL48 is featured along with AKB48 and its overseas sister group to perform on One Love Asia, an online charity concert organized by WebTVAsia and YouTube as part of UNICEF ASIA's #Reimagine global campaign to raise funds for children and families affected by the pandemic. Glory, Beanie, and Reyna of DEL48 were chosen to participate.

In early October 2020, DEL48 members have stopped posting on their official Instagram page and begin to open their personal account, leading to rumors about disbandment. DEL48's producer, Deepak Nandal, later confirmed YKBK48 Entertainment had terminated its members' contract. He also confirmed the group have recorded its debut music video, an Indian version of Flying Get. However, on 16 October 2020, DEL48 issued an official statement confirming the group is on indifinite suspension with the possibility of coming back in the future.

On 13 July 2022, it was announced YKBK48 Entertainment Pvt. ltd. will be closing up its operation, officially ending DEL48 and MUB48.

Members
On 30 December 2019, the first generation of the group was announced, consisting of 22 members.

References

External links 
 

AKB48 Group
Culture of Delhi
Indian musical groups
Indian girl groups
Music organisations based in India